Member of Parliament in India refers to persons who serve in the Parliament of India. These include:
 Member of Parliament, Lok Sabha: Representative of the Indian citizens to the Lok Sabha, the lower house of the Parliament of India.
 Member of Parliament, Rajya Sabha: Representative of the Indian states to the Rajya Sabha, the upper house of the Parliament of India.

Rajya Sabha

 List of current members of the Rajya Sabha
 List of nominated members of Rajya Sabha
 List of Rajya Sabha members from Andhra Pradesh
 List of Rajya Sabha members from Arunachal Pradesh
 List of Rajya Sabha members from Assam
 List of Rajya Sabha members from Bihar
 List of Rajya Sabha members from Chhattisgarh
 List of Rajya Sabha members from Delhi
 List of Rajya Sabha members from Goa
 List of Rajya Sabha members from Gujarat
 List of Rajya Sabha members from Haryana
 List of Rajya Sabha members from Himachal Pradesh
 List of Rajya Sabha members from Jammu and Kashmir
 List of Rajya Sabha members from Jharkhand
 List of Rajya Sabha members from Karnataka
 List of Rajya Sabha members from Kerala
 List of Rajya Sabha members from Madhya Pradesh
 List of Rajya Sabha members from Maharashtra
 List of Rajya Sabha members from Manipur
 List of Rajya Sabha members from Meghalaya
 List of Rajya Sabha members from Mizoram
 List of Rajya Sabha members from Nagaland
 List of Rajya Sabha members from Odisha
 List of Rajya Sabha members from Puducherry
 List of Rajya Sabha members from Punjab
 List of Rajya Sabha members from Rajasthan
 List of Rajya Sabha members from Sikkim
 List of Rajya Sabha members from Tamil Nadu
 List of Rajya Sabha members from Telangana
 List of Rajya Sabha members from Tripura
 List of Rajya Sabha members from Uttar Pradesh
 List of Rajya Sabha members from Uttarakhand
 List of Rajya Sabha members from West Bengal

Lok Sabha
 Lists of members of the Lok Sabha of India: Members of the 1st Lok Sabha to the 13th Lok Sabha
 List of members of the 14th Lok Sabha
 List of members of the 15th Lok Sabha
 List of members of the 16th Lok Sabha
 List of members of the 17th Lok Sabha

Parliament of India